Dichomeris lespedezae is a moth in the family Gelechiidae. It was described by Kyu-Tek Park in 1994. It is found in south-eastern Siberia, Korea and Japan.

The length of the forewings is 6.5–7 mm. The forewings are light orange, with a dark fuscous fascia along the anterior margin at the basal one-third, followed by three or four dark fuscous oblique strigulae. The hindwings are grey, darker towards the distal part.

The larvae feed on Lespedeza species.

References

Moths described in 1994
lespedezae